10 złotych may refer to:

10 złotych note, Poland
10 złotych coin, Poland